John George Keeler (2 May 1924 – 9 October 2005) was an English cricketer.  Keeler was a right-handed batsman who bowled right-arm medium pace.  He was born in South Moor, County Durham.

Keeler made his debut for Durham in the 1949 Minor Counties Championship against the Lancashire Second XI.  He played Minor counties cricket for Durham from 1949 to 1957, making 54 appearances.  During this period he made a single first-class appearance for the Minor Counties against the touring Australians in 1953.  He was dismissed in the Minor Counties first-innings for a single run by Bill Johnston, with the Minor Counties being dismissed for just 56 runs.  Following-on ib their second-innings they fared little better, being dismissed for 62, with Keeler scoring 10 runs before being dismissed by Ron Archer.  The Australians won the match by an innings and 171 runs.

He died at South Stanley, County Durham on 9 October 2005.

References

External links
Jackie Keeler at ESPNcricinfo
Jackie Keeler at CricketArchive

1924 births
2005 deaths
People from South Moor
Cricketers from County Durham
English cricketers
Durham cricketers
Minor Counties cricketers